Jack George Robertson (November 11, 1928 – December 7, 1971) was a provincial politician from Alberta, Canada. He served as a member of the Legislative Assembly of Alberta in 1971, sitting with the governing Progressive Conservative caucus, until his death on December 7, 1971.

Political career
Robertson ran for a seat to the Alberta Legislature in the 1971 Alberta general election. He defeated Social Credit incumbent Galen Norris in a hotly contested straight fight to pick up the Stettler electoral district for the Progressive Conservatives.

Robertson died on December 7, 1971.

References

External links
Legislative Assembly of Alberta Members Listing

1928 births
1971 deaths
Progressive Conservative Association of Alberta MLAs